Electro Hiper Europa–Caldas is a Colombian UCI Continental cycling team founded in 2021.

Team roster

Major wins
2021
Stage 3 Tour de Bretagne, Óscar Pelegrí

References

External links

UCI Continental Teams (America)
Cycling teams established in 2021
Cycling teams based in Argentina
Cycling teams based in Colombia